Andesobia is a genus of moths in the subfamily Arctiinae.

Species
 Andesobia boliviana (Gaede, 1923)
 Andesobia flavata (Hampson, 1901)
 Andesobia jelskii (Oberthür, 1881)
 Andesobia sanguinea (Hampson, 1907)

Etymology
The name is feminine in gender, formed by combining the words Andes and –obia from the generic name Phragmatobia.

References

Spilosomina
Moth genera